Ben Saxton (born 14 June 1990) is a British competitive sailor.

He competed at the 2016 Summer Olympics in Rio de Janeiro, in the mixed Nacra 17.

References

1990 births
Living people
British male sailors (sport)
Olympic sailors of Great Britain
Sailors at the 2016 Summer Olympics – Nacra 17